Aref Durvesh is a celebrated and prolific tabla artist who has recorded and performed with Badmarsh & Shri, Sting, Susheela Raman, Cheb Mami, Jeff Beck, Visionary Underground, and is also one of the longest-serving members of Nitin Sawhneys band, having performed on all of his albums as well as all his UK and international tours. His father was a musician, a disciple of Bismillah Khansahib, and a world-renowned shehnai player. Aref grew up with Indian music all around him and fell in love with tabla. Aref has taken traditional tabla performance into a new dimension by integrating it into contemporary urban music, jazz, hip hop and fusion, as well as being a virtuoso in the traditional skills. He is now extending his talents to producing his own album and performing live under his own name, while continuing to tour with Nitin and Shusheela.

Appearances
Aref has appeared twice at the prestigious Mercury Awards for Music, firstly with Nitin and again with Susheela Raman.

Career
Aref is currently working with Xkollective (Xfile Productions), The Nasha Experience, Mo Magic, Susheela Raman, Nitin Sawhney and Sonic Devis.

References

External links
 Link for Aref Durvesh
 Artist Direct
 NME stories
 Nitin Sawhney Link
 Ethnotechno Interview with Aref
 Discography
 Guardian Review
 Myspace
 NME Link
 Last FM Spain
 Musicr.info
 Ethnotechno Review
 Subway Series
 Tigersonic Records
 msn music credits
 Global Rhythm Net
 video

Year of birth missing (living people)
Living people
Indian male musicians
Place of birth missing (living people)
Tabla players